The Fellowship of Churches of Christ in Nigeria (TEKAN) is a federation of Christian denominations in Nigeria. It was founded in 1955. Its president is Nemuel Abubakar Babba.

Members
Church of Christ in Nigeria (COCIN)
The Lutheran Church of Christ in Nigeria (LCCN)
Christian Reformed Church of Nigeria (CRCN)
United Methodist Church of Nigeria (UMCN)
Evangelical Reformed Church of Christ (ERCC)
Ekklesiyar Yan'uwa a Nigeria (EYN)
Nongo Krist Ken Sudan hen Tiv (NKST)
United Church of Christ in Nigeria (HEKAN)
Mambila Baptist Convention of Nigeria (MBCN)
Nigerian Reformed Church (NRC)
Evangelical Church of Christ in Nigeria (ECCN)
Reformed Church of Christ in Nigeria (RCCN)
All Nations Christian Assembly (ANCA)

References

See also 
Christianity in Nigeria
Theological College of Northern Nigeria

Churches in Nigeria
Christian denominations in Africa
Christian organizations established in 1955
Nigeria
1955 establishments in Nigeria